Eddie Firestone (December 11, 1920 – March 1, 2007) was an American radio, television, and film actor who accumulated over 200 total credits during his performing career.

Early life
When he was 12, Firestone was in the cast of Wheatenaville, broadcast on NBC's Pacific network.

Career
An early success was in the title role of radio's That Brewster Boy. While doing that program, he also was an undergraduate student at Northwestern University. He left the program during World War II to join the United States Marine Corps in 1943, where he was commissioned, reaching the rank of captain, remaining in the Marine Corps Reserve until 1957. 

At that time, he was billed as Eddie Firestone Jr.

Some of the first television appearances with Eddie Firestone was in the first season of Jack Webb's Dragnet (1951–52). He guest-starred in "The Big Lamp" in Season 1, Episode 14 on Dragnet, in Season 1, Episode 3 of The Dick Van Dyke Show, and in 1961 in the episode "The Charity Drive" of Window on Main Street. Firestone appeared in several roles on the popular Western television series Bonanza, Hogan's Heroes, as well as in Walt Disney's feature film The Great Locomotive Chase.  He also appeared on Perry Mason in the 1962 episode, "The Case of the "Dodging Domino," the 1963 episode, "The Case of the Decadent Dean," and the 1964 episode, "The Case of the Place Called Midnight." Firestone appeared in Barnaby Jones in the episode titled “Trap Play”(01/07/1975).

In 1967, he appeared as “Red Bailey”, one of three men burglarizing bank safes by using a new & volatile liquid explosive (nitroglycerin), in the only two part episode of the TV Western series Gunsmoke, entitled “Nitro” (S12E28-29).  He returned in 1974 playing the “Hotel Clerk” in “The Tarnished Badge” (S20E9).

He guest-starred in "Prosecutor", the premiere episode of The Silent Force, in 1970. He guest starred in 3 episodes of The Rockford Files. He also appeared in an episode of Knight Rider titled "Slammin' Sammy's Stunt Show Spectacular" in 1982, playing the character of Sammy Phillips. He also played the part of the character "Stumbles" in the 1969 episode "The Joker is Wild, Man, Wild" on Hawaii Five-O. Also appeared in an episode of Cannon as the character Buck Hamlin in season 2 episode 6, "The Predators."

Death
Firestone is buried in Valhalla Memorial Park Cemetery in North Hollywood in Los Angeles, California.

Filmography

The Jackpot (1950) – Mr. McDougall (uncredited)
With a Song in My Heart (1952) – USO Performer (uncredited)
We're Not Married! (1952) – Man in Radio Station (uncredited)
One Minute to Zero (1952) – Lt. Stevens (uncredited)
Call Me Madam (1953) – Reporter (uncredited)
Good Morning, Miss Dove (1955) – Fred Makepeace (uncredited)
The Revolt of Mamie Stover (1956) – Tarzan
The Great Locomotive Chase (1956) – Robert Buffum
The Brass Legend (1956) – Shorty
Bailout at 43,000 (1957) – Captain Mike Cavallero
Joe Butterfly (1957) – Sgt. Oscar Hulick
The Law and Jake Wade (1958) – Burke
The Mountain Road (1960) – Major Lewis
Angel Baby (1961) – Blind Man
Two for the Seesaw (1962) – Oscar
The Destructors (1968) – Dr. Barnes
A Man Called Gannon (1968) – Maz
Panic in the City (1968) – Owens
Suppose They Gave a War and Nobody Came (1970) – Deputy Goulash
Duel (1971) – Café owner
The Todd Killings (1971) – Mr. Hassin
Pickup on 101 (1972) – Auto Mechanic
Play It as It Lays (1972) – Benny Austin
The Stone Killer (1973) – Armitage
Invisible Strangler (1978) – Jacobs

References

Demetria Fulton; previewed Firestone on Barnaby Jones in the episode titled “Trap Play”(01/07/1975).

External links

Battlestar Wiki

1920 births
2007 deaths
Male actors from San Francisco
American male radio actors
American male film actors
American male television actors
Burials at Valhalla Memorial Park Cemetery
United States Marine Corps officers
20th-century American male actors
Northwestern University alumni
United States Marine Corps personnel of World War II